Events in 1974 in Japanese television.

Debuts

Ongoing
Music Fair, music (1964–present)
Mito Kōmon, jidaigeki (1969-2011)
Sazae-san, anime (1969–present)
Ōedo Sōsamō, jidaigeki (1970-1984)
Ōoka Echizen, jidaigeki (1970-1999)
Star Tanjō!, talent (1971-1983)

Endings

See also
1974 in anime
1974 in Japan
List of Japanese films of 1974

References